Wang Burapha Phirom is a khwaeng (subdistrict) of Phra Nakhon District, in Bangkok, Thailand. In 2017 it had a total population of 11,427 people.

Its name after Wang Burapha Phirom, a former palace of Prince Bhanurangsi Savangwongse. The palace was demolished in the 1950s to build a shopping district and three cinemas under the name "Wang Burapha". This area can be considered as the centre of teenagers or young people of that era comparable to Siam Square in present day.

During King Rama V's reign, it was named "Tambon Pak Khlong Talat" eponymous Pak Khlong Talat, a large local wat market by the Chao Phraya River and Khlong Lot.
 
Currently, its location has become a Mega Plaza Saphan Lek, the department store that became the new hub of various kinds of toys and models after nearby Saphan Lek and Khlong Thom was rezoned by  Bangkok Metropolitan Administration (BMA) in 2015.

References

Subdistricts of Bangkok
Phra Nakhon district
Populated places on the Chao Phraya River